Distant Drums is a 1951 American Florida Western film directed by Raoul Walsh and starring Gary Cooper. It is set during the Second Seminole War in the 1840s, with Cooper playing an Army captain who successfully destroys a fort held by Spanish gunrunners and is pursued into the Everglades by a large group of Seminoles. The fort used in the film was the historic Castillo de San Marcos in St. Augustine, Florida, and most of the principal photography was shot on location in Florida.

Distant Drums is wildly historically inaccurate, received mixed reviews upon release, and was a moderate financial success. It is notable for being the source of the Wilhelm scream sound effect, which is believed to have been voiced by cast member Sheb Wooley and is used when a supporting character is attacked by an alligator.

Plot

During the Second Seminole War in 1840, US  Army General Zachary Taylor sends naval Lieutenant Tufts and scout Monk to a remote Florida island home, where the reclusive Captain Quincy Wyatt lives with his 5-year-old son. The soldiers' mission is to destroy a remote "old Spanish fort" being used as a base for Spanish gunrunners aiding the Seminoles, and they convince the reluctant Wyatt to lead the small strike force as Taylor had requested.

Wyatt and his men succeed in destroying the fort (the historic Castillo de San Marcos, which was not harmed during filming), but not before rescuing a group of prisoners who were being held there. One of them, Judy Beckett, develops a romantic attraction to Capt. Wyatt as they flee from a large group of pursuing Seminoles through the Everglades. The journey is difficult, and several of the troops are killed, including one who is attacked by an alligator and produces the first Wilhelm scream as he is dragged under water. Wyatt leads the survivors to his remote homestead, where he is shocked to discover that  his home has been burned and his son is missing. Meanwhile, the pursuing Seminoles arrive nearby, and Wyatt challenges their chief, Ocala, to single combat. Wyatt kills him in an underwater fight and the Seminoles flee. Soon after, he discovers that his son had been taken to safety before his home had been attacked and they are reunited.

Cast
 Gary Cooper as Captain Quincy Wyatt
 Richard Webb as Lieutenant Tufts
 Mari Aldon as Judy Beckett
 Arthur Hunnicutt as Monk
 Carl Harbaugh as Duprez
 Ray Teal as Private Mohair
 Robert Barrat as General Zachary Taylor
 Bob Burns as Indian Boy (uncredited)
 Larry Carper as Chief Ocala (uncredited)
 Sheb Wooley as Private Jessup (uncredited)

Notes

External links

 
 

1951 films
1951 Western (genre) films
1950s historical films
American Western (genre) films
American historical films
Western (genre) cavalry films
Cultural depictions of Zachary Taylor
1950s English-language films
Films directed by Raoul Walsh
Films scored by Max Steiner
Films set in 1840
Films set in Florida
Seminole Wars
Warner Bros. films
1950s American films